The Baltimore Harbor Tunnel is a pair of two-lane road tunnels carrying Interstate 895—the Harbor Tunnel Thruway—under the Patapsco River southeast of downtown Baltimore, Maryland.

Description
Two-way traffic may occur in either tunnel for overnight roadwork or during emergencies that close down one of the tunnels. The Tunnel has lane control signals to control which lanes are open, closed or as contra-flow traffic.

Both portals have ventilation buildings, with a total of 32 fans in place to replace the air within the tunnels, which is drawn in through the tunnel floors and exhausted through the tunnel ceilings.

As of July 1, 2015, the toll rate for cars is $4.00 cash or $3.00 E-ZPass, paid in both directions. Vehicles with more than two axles pay additional amounts, up to $30.00 for six axles. In March 2020, all-electronic tolling was implemented as a result of the COVID-19 pandemic, with tolls payable through E-ZPass or Video Tolling, which uses automatic license plate recognition. All-electronic tolling was made permanent in August 2020.

History
The tunnel and approaches were designed by Singstad and Baillie, a New York-based engineering firm specializing in tunnel design, in association with the J. E. Greiner Company, a local Baltimore-based firm. The tunnel was formed out of twenty-one  sections individually submerged into the harbor and secured with rocks and backfill; the first of these tunnel segments was sunk on April 11, 1956. The remainder of the tunnel was constructed using the cut-and-cover method, extending from the submerged tubes to the north and south portals. The project's costs would ultimately reach $150 million ($ million in ).

The tunnel opened on November 29, 1957 with a dedication by Maryland Governor Theodore McKeldin and a crowd of 4,000 spectators. The initial toll for standard cars was forty cents. In the first 12 hours of operation, the tunnel handled an estimated 10,000 vehicles, mostly drivers from Maryland. In the same period, the tunnel also experienced its first collision (15 minutes after opening), first flat tire and first stalled vehicle.

The tunnel was considered a success by the Maryland Transportation Authority (MDTA), as it eliminated 51 traffic signals for through-traffic in Baltimore, and reduced neighborhood street commercial traffic by up to 40%.  However, increased tunnel usage and high traffic volume led to the planning, construction, and opening of the nearby Fort McHenry Tunnel in 1985, creating the final link of Interstate 95 in Maryland. The Harbor Tunnel was then closed in phases for extensive rehabilitation, beginning in March 1987. It was fully reopened by 1990.

In November 2007, the 50th anniversary of the tunnel serving travelers was observed.
In November 2018, the MDTA started a multi-year project to replace the I-895 bridge spans north of the tunnel. The $189 million project also includes $28 million to repair and upgrade the tunnel itself; the entire project is scheduled to be completed by summer 2021.

See also

References

External links

Crossings of the Patapsco River
Tolled sections of Interstate Highways
Transportation buildings and structures in Baltimore
Toll tunnels in Maryland
Tunnels completed in 1957
Interstate 95
1957 establishments in Maryland
Road tunnels in Maryland
Immersed tube tunnels in the United States